Gladys Valerie was an American singer and actress. She worked during the silent film era.

Life and career 
In 1919, Valerie sang at a benefit concert for blind soldiers. In the Harrisburg Telegraph, it was written that  "Gladys Valerie sang at a concert given for the benefit of blind soldiers, and judging by the warm reception which the audience accorded her, Miss Valerie's voice has lost none of its original beauty since her sojourn in the silent drama. Miss Valerie sang on the operatic stage before taking up picture work."

In a November 1919 issue of Motion Picture News, it was written that "Gladys Valerie was somewhat surprised recently by the noticeable enthusiasm and pleasure evinced by a certain young lieutenant who had just returned from overseas, upon being presented to Miss Valerie. She ventured to ask the reason for his somewhat unusually cordial acknowledgement of the introduction, and was very much astonished to learn that she was considered the "Best Girl" of Company D - 105 Artillery A. E. F. It seems that when a picture show was given in camp, each company adopted some screen luminary who appealed to the voters as their "Best Girl" and Miss Valerie had been chosen by this lieutenant's company for that distinction."

In a December 1919 issue of Motion Picture News, it was written that "Gladys Valerie selected a certain dress from a wholesale house the other day. Hardly had the dress reached home, than Miss Valerie was called to the telephone, and an interested voice asked whether they might name the spring models that they intended making from the one she chose, the Gladys Valerie frocks. Miss Valeria, with her usual graciousness, replied that she had no objection whatever."

Partial filmography 
 The Heart of a Girl (1918) as Helen Murray
Marie, Ltd. (1919) as Zelie
 Mrs. Wiggs of the Cabbage Patch (1919) as Maggie Duncan
The Mind the Paint Girl (1919) as Jimmie Birch
Dawn (1919) as Mazie Sanborn (a film directed by J. Stuart Blackton and based on a novel by Eleanor H. Porter)
Thoughtless Women (1920) as the sister
 Behind Masks (1921) as Kate Cansard
 A Pasteboard Crown (1922) as Edna Thrall
 Tin Gods (1926)
 The Broadway Drifter (1927) as Laura Morris

References

American silent film actresses
20th-century American actresses